The Moon has been shown to have a "tail" of sodium atoms too faint to be detected by the human eye. Hundreds of thousands of kilometers long, the feature was discovered in 1998 as a result of scientists from Boston University observing the Leonid meteor shower.

The Moon is constantly releasing atomic sodium as a fine dust from its surface due to photon-stimulated desorption, solar wind sputtering, and meteorite impacts. Solar radiation pressure accelerates the sodium atoms away from the Sun, forming an elongated tail toward the antisolar direction.

The continual impacts of small meteorites produce a constant "tail" from the Moon, but the Leonids intensified it, thus making it more observable from Earth than usual.

ISRO's Chandrayaan-2, recently discovered an abundance of sodium on the Moon.

See also

Atmosphere of the Moon
Lunar Atmosphere and Dust Environment Explorer

References

External links 

Lunar science
Sodium